Dale Hollow Lake State Resort Park is a Kentucky state park located on the Frogue Peninsula on the northern shore of Dale Hollow Reservoir in Clinton and Cumberland counties. The park comprises .

References

External links
Dale Hollow Lake State Resort Park Kentucky Department of Parks
Dale Hollow Lake U.S. Army Corps of Engineers Nashville District

State parks of Kentucky
Protected areas of Cumberland County, Kentucky